Indian Romeo and Juliet is a 1912 American drama film directed by Laurence Trimble and starring Florence Turner and Wallace Reid. The story is an adaption of Romeo and Juliet by William Shakespeare set in Mohawk and Huron tribes.

Cast
Florence Turner as Ethona (Juliet)
Wallace Reid as Oniatare (Romeo)
Harry T. Morey as Kowa (Count Paris) (credited as Harry Morrey)
Hal Reid as Rakowaneh (Capulet) (credited as James H. Reid)
Mrs. Adelaide Ober as Neok (the Nurse)
Harold Wilson as Oyenkwa (Friar Laurence)

Reception
A critic for Moving Picture World wrote, "It will be a good feature picture although the story is not very vital. The photographs are beautiful." A critic for The Cinema described it as "quite out of the ordinary, considering that it has strong romantic and poetic tendencies. It is an attempt to translate poetry into cinematography. Both the acting and the magnificent natural setting convey to the observer a vivid picture of the romance of the red man." They concluded that it is "altogether a remarkable film and a distinct improvement on previous Indian drama."

References

External links

1912 films
American black-and-white films
Silent American drama films
1912 drama films
American silent short films
Films directed by Laurence Trimble
1910s American films